Václav Rais (20 April 1910 – 20 August 1985) was a Czech fencer. He competed in the team épée event at the 1936 Summer Olympics.

References

External links
 

1910 births
1985 deaths
Czech male épée fencers
Czechoslovak male épée fencers
Olympic fencers of Czechoslovakia
Fencers at the 1936 Summer Olympics